The Muscoot River is a short tributary of the Croton River in  Putnam and Westchester counties in the state of New York.

Path
The rivers headwaters flow southwards from gates at Kirk Lake, a controlled lake in the New York City water supply system, and Lake Mahopac, lying near one-another in the Putnam County hamlet of Mahopac, New York in the Town of Carmel.  About two miles south the flow of Secor Brook joins in, an outfall from Lake Secor to the northwest.  After trending slightly southeast for a bit over three miles the Muscoot drains into the Amawalk Reservoir in the town of Somers, crossing about midway along its length into Westchester County.

Upon leaving the Amawalk Reservoir via a spillway in the Amawalk Dam at the reservoir's southern end, the Muscoot is shortly joined by Hallocks Mill Brook from the west. Less than two miles later it flows into the northwestern reaches of the Muscoot Reservoir west of Whitehall Corners and northwest of Katonah, New York.

See also
List of rivers of New York

References

Rivers of New York (state)
Rivers of Westchester County, New York
Rivers of Putnam County, New York
Tributaries of the Hudson River